Jahan (Urdu:) is a word of Persian origin meaning "world" or "universe". It is used as first name or surname in the Middle East, Central and South Asia. The Turkish rendering of the same name is Cihan.

Along with Jehan, it is also a variant and ancient form of French name and surname Jean. The surnames Jahan and Jehan have been most prevalent in northwestern France (e.g. Normandy, Brittany, Touraine).

See also 
 Jahan Ara
 Jahan Dotson
 Jahan Salehi
 Jahan Shah
 Jahan Temür
 Khan Jahan Ali
 Nasreen Jahan
 Nur Jahan
 Shah Jahan III
 Shah Jahan

References

Persian masculine given names
Persian words and phrases
Bengali words and phrases